Omorgus regalis is a species of hide beetle in the subfamily Omorginae.

References

regalis
Beetles described in 1954